Cape Spencer Lighthouse is a lighthouse in the Australian state of South Australia located on Cape Spencer on the Yorke Peninsula in gazetted locality of Inneston.  The navigation aid was originally established as an automatic beacon which was first lit in late 1950, was established after a lengthy period of lobbying of the Australian government.  The automatic beacon was replaced in 1975 by an automatic lighthouse facility.

See also

 List of lighthouses in Australia

References

External links

 Australian Maritime Safety Authority

Lighthouses in South Australia
Lighthouses completed in 1975
1950 establishments in Australia
Spencer Gulf
Investigator Strait
Yorke Peninsula